Stefan Anton Reck is a German orchestra conductor and painter. He was born on 26 April 1960 in Baden-Baden, Germany.

Career 

After having attended the "Richard Wagner-Gymnasium" in Baden-Baden, he studied piano at the Hochschule für Musik in Freiburg and at the same time philosophy and history of art at the University of Freiburg. He then continued his studies in Berlin, at the Hochschule der Künste, where he graduated in 1986. While still studying at the Hochschule der Künste, in 1985 he won the 1st International Arturo Toscanini competition for orchestra conductors, and then the first prize in the International Gino Marinuzzi competition for orchestra conducting. He was awarded later on a scholarship from the Tanglewood Music Festival, where he could study with Seiji Ozawa and Leonard Bernstein.

In the following years, he collaborated with some well-known Italian Orchestras (Orchestra Sinfonica di San Remo, Orchestra Regionale del Lazio). In 1999 he was then appointed as Music Director of the Teatro Massimo and held this title until 2003.

During these years, his collaboration with M° Claudio Abbado resulted in Wozzeck at Salzburger Ostfestspiele.

In 1998 M° Reck conducted his first Der Ring des Nibelungen at the Teatro Verdi in Trieste.
He then began his collaboration with the Gustav Mahler Jugendorchester, in opera productions such as “Falstaff”, and concerts during its European tour, with works of Shostakovich, Bartók, Mahler, Scrjabin.

In the meanwhile he opened the 2001 season of Teatro Massimo in Palermo with Lulu by Alban Berg.
This production has been recorded live and released in a cd by OehmsClassic.
The following months counted many collaborations with Orchestre National de France, Maggio Musicale Fiorentino, Teatro Comunale of Bologna, and Teatro Carlo Felice in Genova.
At the end of the same year, he ended his first ring in Trieste with Götterdämmerung.

In 2002, after having conducted Les Contes d'Hoffmann by Jacques Offenbach, M° Reck conducted a spectacular production, in memory of the survivors of the Holocaust “La Memoria dell’Offesa”, which featured, among others, Der Kaiser von Atlantis by Viktor Ullmann and A Survivor from Warsaw by Arnold Schönberg, with Harvey Keitel. 
In these year an intense activity followed, both in the contemporary and traditional repertoire:
Worth mentioning are Jeanne d’Arc au Bûcher by Arthur Honegger in Palermo, Salomè by Richard Strauss in Genoa, Norma in Tokyo and Der Freischutz in Leipzig, and collaborations with Orchestre National de France, Orchestre national de Montpellier, Orchestra of Santa Cecilia, and Maggio Musicale.
In 2004 he debuted in three major venues: Semperoper Dresden, with Aida, Bayerische Staatsoper, with Lulu by Alban Berg and Los Angeles Opera with Le Nozze di Figaro. Moreover, he conducted Daphne by Richard Strauss in the renewed Teatro La Fenice in Venice: a cd of the performance has been released by Dynamic.

In 2005 Reck was invited to conduct two new productions at the New National Theatre Tokyo, Alban Berg's Lulu and Richard Wagner's Die Meistersinger von Nürnberg.

An intense concert and opera activity followed. Particularly noteworthy among all performances: the first European performance of the opera Dead Man Walking by Jake Heggie at the Semperoper Dresden, Richard Wagner's Tristan und Isolde at the Teatro Reggio di Torino, Der Ring des Nibelungen at the reopened Teatro Petruzzelli in Bari, Debuts at the Hamburgische Staatsoper, the Oper Frankfurt; concerts with: the Orchestra Sinfonica Nazionale della RAI, Turin, the Orchestre National de Montpellier, the Royal Scottish National Orchestra (Edinburgh Festival), the orchestras Gran Teatro la
Fenice, Venice, of the Maggio Musicale Fiorentino and the Tokyo Symphony Orchestra.

Among his more recent performances, in 2011 Tannhäuser by Richard Wagner at Teatro Comunale di Bologna.

With the 2013 production by Yannis Kokkos of the Fliegender Höllander by Richard Wagner, Stefan Anton Reck was tributed a special personal success both at  Teatro Comunale of Bologna and at Teatro San Carlo of Naples.

He has been invited by the RAI National Symphony Orchestra to conduct a tribute concert for the 90th Birthday of M°Pierre Boulez in 2015, where he will conduct Pierre Boulez's "Livre pour Cordes" and "Notations" n.1, 2, 3, 4 and 7.

M°Reck is mostly renowned world-wide for his interpretations of Gustav Mahler’s work, as well as of the Second Viennese School’s (Berg, Schoenberg and Webern) and for his interest and support of contemporary music.

These features can be found in his vast painting production, characterised mostly by an abstract and synesthetical style, with contaminations and fascinations from the musical world.

It is only recently that he decided to start exhibiting, in addition to his conducting activity, with dates in the most renowned galleries and museums.
A selected choice of his works will be on display in Italy for the first time at the prestigious PAN Palazzo delle Arti of Naples, in a personal exhibition from 18 September to 19 October 2014.

Discography

 R. Strauss, Daphne, Gran Teatro La Fenice, Dynamic, CD et DVD
 Berg, Lulu, Teatro Massimo di Palermo, OehmsClassics
 Wagner Portrait, Albert Dohmen, Orchestra del Teatro Massimo di Palermo, Arte Nova Classics
 Schostakowitsch, Symphonie n° 1, op. 10 ; Skrjabin, Le Poème de l’Extase, op. 54, Gustav Mahler Jugendorchester, Edition Zeitklang
 Schönberg, Erwartung (Anja Silja) ; Poulenc, La voix humaine (Raina Kabaivanska), Orchestra del Teatro Massimo di Palermo
 Mahler, Symphonie n° 7, Gustav Mahler Jugendorchester, Preiser Records
 Mahler, Symphonie n° 10, Adagio ; Wagner, Wotans Abschied und Feuerzauber ; Bartók, Der wunderbare Mandarin, Gustav Mahler Jugendorchester, Preiser Records
 Tutino, Riccardo III, Orchestre del Teatro Sociale di Rovigo, Ermitage

Press

 Opéra international 255, mars 2001, Berg, Lulu
 Die Opernwelt, März 2001, Berg, Lulu
 FAZ Nr. 261, 9. 11. 2001, Lulu CD
 Süddeutsche Zeitung Nr. 245, 24. 10. 2001, Lulu CD
 Stuttgarter Zeitung, 13. 2. 2002, Lulu CD
 FAZ Nr. 114, 18. 5. 2002, Schönberg, Moses und Aron
 Midi libre, 14. 12. 2003, Berlioz, Symphonie fantastique
 Anaclase, 29. 4. 2005, Berg, Violin Concerto, Mahler, Symphony n° 6
 Die Opernwelt, November 2005, Wagner, Meistersinger von Nürnberg
 Münchner Merkur, 1. 10. 2005, Wagner, Meistersinger von Nürnberg
 The Scotsman, 16. 8. 2006, Mahler, Das Lied von der Erde
 The Herald, 16. 8. 2006, Mahler, Das Lied von der Erde
 Seen and heard international opera reviews, 18. 10. 2008, Strauss, Ariadne auf Naxos
 Wanderer's Blog, 10/2009, Beethoven, Egmont, Eroica
 L’Hérault du jour, 10. 11. 2009, Mahler, Symphony n° 6
 Midi libre, 10. 11. 2009, Mahler, Symphony n° 6

References

External links
 Official website

Living people
1960 births
German male conductors (music)
People from Baden-Baden
21st-century German conductors (music)
21st-century German male musicians
Oehms Classics artists